Isancistrum is a genus of monogeneans in the family Gyrodactylidae. Unlike most monogeneans which are parasitic on fish or other vertebrates, species of Isancistrum are parasitic on squids (molluscs).

Species
Isancistrum loliginis de Beauchamp, 1912
Isancistrum subulatae Llewellyn, 1984

References

Gyrodactylidae
Monogenea genera